Aerenea periscelifera is a species of beetle in the family Cerambycidae. It was described by Thomson in 1868. It is known from Colombia and Brazil.

References

Compsosomatini
Beetles of South America
Insects of Brazil
Arthropods of Colombia
Beetles described in 1868